Hans Nielsen Hauge is a Norwegian film from 1961 directed by Kåre Bergstrøm. It is a dramatization of the life of the lay minister Hans Nielsen Hauge (1771–1824). The film received a lukewarm reception from Verdens Gang's reviewer, who gave it three out of six stars.

Plot
The film opens in 1804, when Crown Prince Regent Frederick is ruling Denmark–Norway. The Royal Danish Chancellery has issued an arrest warrant for Hans Nielsen Hauge. The arrest warrant is sent to all the county governors in Norway, and Hauge is taken to Christiania in irons. The film follows the trial against Hauge. An impression of his past life and work is given in retrospect. The case against Hauge lasted many years because Copenhagen found no reason to hurry. This was a turning point in Norway, and Napoleon was building an empire in Europe. The case was not concluded until 1813.

Cast

 Preben Lerdorff Rye as King Frederick VI
 Per Sunderland as Hans Nielsen Hauge
 Harald Aimarsen as a farmer
 Oscar Amundsen as Radich, the judge in Moss and Tune
 Eilif Armand as Lange, a bookbinder in Bergen
 Haakon Arnold as a police officer
 Beate Berntsen as the waitress at the club
 John Birkehoel as a prison guard
 Wilfred Breistrand as a lieutenant in Fredrikstad
 Erik Melbye Brekke as a coachman
 Hans Coucheron-Aamot as Aars, the judge
 Oscar Egede-Nissen as a man arrested for drunkenness
 John Eide as a singer outside the prison
 Helge Essmar as the prison director in Christiania
 Lauritz Falk as Blom, a court justice
 Tore Foss as Wulfsberg, a policeman
 Arvid Furulund as a man serving soup
 Jens Gunderssen as Peter Collett, the assessor
 Ulf Gustavsen as Mikkel Nielsen Hauge as a boy
 Egil Hagen as the man with news at the club
 Sverre Hansen as a merchant in Bergen
 Olafr Havrevold as Seeberg, the parish priest in Tune
 Egil Hjorth-Jenssen as a printer in Christiania
 Thor Hjorth-Jenssen as Gram, the sheriff in Eiker
 Randi Holst-Jensen as the woman at the front of the food line
 Ola Isene as Lausen Bull, the mayor
 Ellen Iversen as a woman
 Ola B. Johannessen as a man arrested for drunkenness
 Lasse Kolstad as Ole Nielsen, the sheriff
 Jolly Kramer-Johansen as a guard
 Einar Nic. Kristensen as the boys' father
 Lars Kristensen as Hans Nielsen Hauge as a boy
 Bernt Erik Larssen as Doctor Müller
 Erik Lassen as the man in the wagon
 Gunnar Lauring as Kaas
 Per Lillo-Stenberg as the judge Hans Hagerup Falbe
 Erling Lindahl as Hoffgaard, the bailiff in Smålenene
 Lothar Lindtner as a merchant in Bergen
 Georg Løkkeberg as Bishop Schønheyder
 Egil Lorck as a man arrested for drunkenness
 Leidulv Lothe as a singer outside the prison
 Fridtjof Mjøen as Pavel, the castle priest in Christiania
 Harald Myhrbråten as a prison guard
 Rolf Nannestad as a prisoner
 Ole-Jørgen Nilsen as a sergeant in Fredrikstad
 Nils Nittel as a man
 Teddy Nordgren as a policeman in Bergen
 Rolf Nordland as a clerk and secretary
 Ragnar Olason as a prison guard
 Carl Børseth Rasmussen as Bishop Nordahl Brun
 Helge Reiss as the prosecutor
 Ingolf Rogde as Kreydal, the judge in Lillesan
 Rolf Sand as a peddler
 Aud Schønemann as a woman
 Ragnar Schreiner as a prisoner
 Espen Skjønberg as Mikkel Nielsen Hauge
 Ada Skolmen as a woman
 Rolf Søder as a farmer
 Alfred Solaas as Urdahl, the parish priest in Tune
 Astrid Sommer as the farmer's wife
 Harald Heide Steen as a man in Bjørnstad
 Henrik Anker Steen as Feiermann, the parish priest in Fredrikstad
 Siv Stokland as Ragnhild, the farmer's daughter
 Svend Svendsen as a tenant farmer
 Roy Thorsrud as a sheriff's deputy
 Stevelin Urdahl as a neighbor
 Kåre Wicklund as the man at the front of the food line
 Carsten Winger as Ludvig Ingstad, a councilor

References

External links
 
 Hans Nielsen Hauge at the National Library of Norway

1961 films
Norwegian drama films
Norwegian black-and-white films
Films set in the 19th century
Films set in Norway
1961 drama films
Films directed by Kåre Bergstrøm